The Balkan Cross Country Championships has since 1958 been an annual regional international competition in cross country running amongst athletes from the Balkans. It forms part of the Balkan Games, the latter an event to encourage the relations amongst the participating nations surrounding the Mediterranean Sea and it traces its history back to 1940. There were no races in 2010). It is organised by the Association of the Balkan Athletics Federations

The championships features two events: a ten-kilometre (6.2-mile) race for men and an eight-kilometre (5-mile) race for women. The distances of the races have varied over the lifetime of the event. Originally the men's race was a 10 km race, but this changed to a 12 km (7.5 miles) race during the period from 1977 to 2008. The women's race began with a 2 km distance, increasing to 4 km in 1977, then 6 km from 1998 to 2008. National team competitions are held within the individual races, with each nation's score being the total of the finishing positions of their best three athletes.

The first edition in 1940 was a men's only competition; Josip Kotnik of Yugoslavia was the inaugural winner. A 15-year hiatus followed with the onset of World War II and the regional event was reborn in 1955. There was another hiatus to follow for two years but the 1958 edition, where Yugoslavia's Olympic medalist and International Cross Country champion Franjo Mihalić was victorious, marked the full establishment of the competition; the Balkan championship was contested annually thereafter. A women's race was held for the first time the following year and Akhad Dil Ciraj of Turkey became the first women's champion.

It is one of three major Balkan regional athletic championships, alongside the two annual track and field events – the Balkan Games and the Balkan Indoor Athletics Championships.

Past winners

Participating countries

Present

Other Member

http://www.balkan-athletics.eu/members.php

Former
 (1940)
 (1943–1992)
 (1992–2003)
 (2003–2006)

References

External links
Official website for Balkan Athletics

Cross Country Championships
Cross country running competitions
Recurring sporting events established in 1940
European international sports competitions
Athletics team events
1940 establishments in Europe